The Men's 50 metre butterfly competition of the 2014 FINA World Swimming Championships (25 m) was held on 5 December with the heats and the semifinals and 6 December with the final.

Records
Prior to the competition, the existing world and championship records were as follows.

The following records were established during the competition:

Results

Heats
The heats were held at 10:25.

Semifinals
The semifinals were held at 18:17.

Semifinal 1

Semifinal 2

Final
The final were held at 18:52.

References

Men's 50 metre butterfly